4-(γ-Glutamylamino)butanoic acid is molecule that consists of L-glutamate conjugated to γ-aminobutyric acid (GABA). It is the substrate of the enzyme γ-glutamyl-γ-aminobutyrate hydrolase, which is involved in the biosynthesis of polyamines.

References

Amino acid derivatives
Biosynthesis
Dicarboxylic acids